Přemysl Švarc (born 27 March 1985) is a Czech triathlete.

At the 2012 Summer Olympics men's triathlon on Tuesday 7 August, he placed 45th.

References 

1985 births
Living people
Czech male triathletes
Olympic triathletes of the Czech Republic
Triathletes at the 2012 Summer Olympics
20th-century Czech people
21st-century Czech people